Vista Alegre is a municipality in the northern part of the state of Rio Grande do Sul, Brazil. The population is 2,739 (2020 est.) in an area of 77.46 km². Its elevation is 546 m.

References

External links
http://www.citybrazil.com.br/rs/vistaalegre/ 

Municipalities in Rio Grande do Sul